Jacques Brodin (22 December 1946 – 1 October 2015) was a French fencer. He won a bronze medal in the team épée event at the 1964 Summer Olympics.

References

External links
 

1946 births
2015 deaths
French male épée fencers
Olympic fencers of France
Fencers at the 1964 Summer Olympics
Fencers at the 1972 Summer Olympics
Olympic bronze medalists for France
Olympic medalists in fencing
Medalists at the 1964 Summer Olympics
20th-century French people